Henry Anderson Watt (28 February 1863 – 2 December 1929) was a Liberal Member of Parliament, who represented Glasgow College from 1906 to 1918.

At the 1918 general election, his constituency was abolished as part of electoral reform. Watt stood for Glasgow Maryhill but came bottom of the poll.

He later contested Govan at the 1923 general election, but Watt finished last place out of just two candidates, failing to defeat the sitting Labour MP Neil Maclean in what was a safe seat for the Labour Party.

References 

1863 births
1929 deaths
Members of the Parliament of the United Kingdom for Glasgow constituencies
UK MPs 1906–1910
UK MPs 1910
UK MPs 1910–1918
Scottish Liberal Party MPs